Milbert Amplifiers is an American electronics manufacturer based in Gaithersburg, Maryland.

History and products 
Milbert manufactures audio equipments.  It introduces its mobile vacuum-tube audio amplifier in 1986, which has been followed by several models collectively in continuous production for nearly 30 years.  The company also produces vacuum-tube guitar and musical amplifiers  using unique impedance conversion  which is claimed to prolong tube operating lifetimes.

Notes

References
 product review in Tone Audio

External links

Audio amplifier manufacturers
Consumer electronics brands
Audio equipment manufacturers of the United States
Guitar amplifier manufacturers
Music equipment manufacturers
Companies based in Gaithersburg, Maryland
Valve amplifiers